The 1990 All-Big Ten Conference football team consists of American football players chosen as All-Big Ten Conference players for the 1990 NCAA Division I-A football season.

Offensive selections

Quarterbacks
 Matt Rodgers, Iowa (AP-1; Coaches-1)
 Greg Frey, Ohio State (AP-2; Coaches-2)

Running backs
 Jon Vaughn, Michigan (AP-1; Coaches-1)
 Nick Bell, Iowa (AP-2; Coaches-1)
 Tico Duckett, Michigan State (AP-1; Coaches-2)
 Howard Griffith, Illinois (AP-2; Coaches-2)

Receivers
 Richard Buchanan, Northwestern (Coaches-1)
 Jeff Graham, Ohio State (Coaches-1)
 Desmond Howard, Michigan (AP-1; Coaches-2)
 Shawn Wax, Illinois (AP-1; Coaches-2)

Tight ends
 Mike Titley, Iowa (AP-1; Coaches-2)
 Duane Young, Michigan State (AP-2; Coaches-1)

Centers
 Dan Beatty, Ohio State (Coaches-1) Tie
 Curt Lovelace, Illinois (AP-1)
 Chris Thome, Minnesota (Coaches-1) Tie

Guards
 Dean Dingman, Michigan (AP-1; Coaches-1)
 Eric Moten, Michigan State (AP-1; Coaches-1)
 Jason Cegialski, Purdue (Coaches-2)
 Tim Simpson, Illinois (Coaches-2)

Tackles
 Tom Dohring, Michigan (Coaches-1)
 Greg Skrepenak, Michigan (AP-1; Coaches-1)
 Rob Baxley, Iowa (Coaches-2)
 James Johnson, Michigan State (AP-1; Coaches-2)

Defensive selections

Linemen
 Mel Agee, Illinois (AP-1; Coaches-1)
 Don Davey, Wisconsin (AP-1; Coaches-1)
 Moe Gardner, Illinois (AP-1; Coaches-1)
 Jim Johnson, Iowa (AP-1; Coaches-1)
 Matt Ruhland, Iowa (AP-1; Coaches-2)
 Carlos Jenkins, Michigan State (Coaches-1)
 Dixon Edwards, Michigan State (Coaches-2)
 Alonzo Spellman, Ohio State (Coaches-2)
 Mike Sunvold, Minnesota (Coaches-2)
 Bobby Wilson, Michigan State (Coaches-2)
 Jeff Zgonina, Purdue (Coaches-2)

Linebackers
 Darrick Brownlow, Illinois (AP-1; Coaches-1)
 Melvin Foster, Iowa (AP-1; Coaches-1)
 Steve Tovar, Ohio State (Coaches-1)
 Erick Anderson, Michigan (AP-1; Coaches-2)
 John Derby, Iowa (Coaches-2)
 Mark Hagen, Indiana (Coaches-2)

Defensive backs
 Mike Dumas, Indiana (AP-1; Coaches-1)
 Merton Hanks, Iowa (AP-1; Coaches-1)
 Tripp Welborne, Michigan (AP-1; Coaches-1)
 Vinnie Clark, Ohio State (Coaches-2)
 Steve Jackson, Purdue (Coaches-2)
 Henry Jones, Illinois (Coaches-2)
 Marlon Primous, Illinois (Coaches-2)

Special teams

Kickers
 J. D. Carlson, Michigan (AP-1)
 John Langeloh, Michigan State (Coaches-1)
 Doug Higgins, Illinois (Coaches-2)

Punters
 Macky Smith, Indiana (AP-1; Coaches-1)
 Jeff Bohlman, Ohio State (Coaches-2)

Key
Bold = Consensus first-team selection by both the coaches and media

AP = Selected by the conference media

Coaches = Selected by the Big Ten Conference coaches

See also
1990 College Football All-America Team

References

All-Big Ten Conference
All-Big Ten Conference football teams